"A Predicament" is a humorous short story by Edgar Allan Poe, usually combined with its companion piece "How to Write a Blackwood Article". It was originally titled "The Scythe of Time". The paired stories parody the Gothic sensation tale, popular in England and America since the early 19th century.

Plot summary
The bizarre story follows a female narrator, Signora Psyche Zenobia. While walking through "the goodly  city of Edina" with her  poodle and her  black servant, Pompey, she is drawn to a large Gothic cathedral. At the steeple, Zenobia sees a small opening she wishes to look through. Standing on Pompey's shoulders, she pushes her head through the opening, realizing she is in the face of a giant clock. As she gazes out at the city beyond, she soon finds that the sharp minute hand has begun to dig into her neck. Slowly, the minute hand decapitates her. At one point, pressure against her neck causes her eye to fall and roll down into the gutter and then to the street below. Her other eye follows thereafter. Finally, the clock has fully severed her head from her body. She does not express despair and is, in fact, glad to be rid of it. For a moment, she wonders which is the real Zenobia: her headless body or her severed head. The head then gives a heroic speech which Zenobia's body cannot hear because it has no ears. Her narration continues without her head, as she is now able to step down from her predicament. In fear Pompey runs off, and Zenobia sees that a rat has eaten her poodle.

"How to Write a Blackwood Article"

The companion piece, "How to Write a Blackwood Article", is a satirical "how-to" fiction on formulaic horror stories typically printed in the Scottish Blackwood's Magazine. The term "article", in Poe's time, also commonly referred to short stories rather than just non-fiction. In this mock essay, Poe stresses the need for elevating sensations in writing. The sensations should build up, it says, until the final moment, usually involving a brush with death.

Zenobia herself is the narrator and main character of this story in the city of Edina. She is told by her editor to kill herself and record the sensations. Poe may have intended this as a jab at women writers.

It is unclear how much of this story is meant to be sarcastic. The humor, however, is based on schadenfreude.

Publication history
Originally pairing them together as "The Psyche Zenobia" and "The Scythe of Time", Poe first published these pieces in the American Museum based in Baltimore, Maryland in November 1838. The stories were retitled when they were republished in Tales of the Grotesque and Arabesque in 1840.

Adaptations
"A Predicament" was adapted in 2000 for National Public Radio by the Radio Tales series, under the name "Edgar Allan Poe's Predicament".

Notes

References
 Sova, Dawn B. Edgar Allan Poe: A to Z. Checkmark Books, 2001.

External links
 
 
 
 

Short stories by Edgar Allan Poe
1838 short stories
Comic short stories
Works originally published in American magazines
Works originally published in literary magazines